Events from the year 1575 in art.

Events
June - The bronze fauns on Bartolommeo Ammanati's Fountain of Neptune in Florence are completed.
Approximate date - Lavinia Fontana begins her career in Bologna as the first female career artist in Western Europe.

Works

Alessandro Allori - Christ and the Samaritan Woman (Altarpiece for Basilica of Santa Maria Novella, Florence; now Prato)
Federico Barocci - Madonna and Child with the Infant John the Baptist and St Joseph (Madonna with the Cat) (approximate date; National Gallery, London)
Lavinia Fontana - Monkey Child (her earliest known work; now lost)
Titian - Saint Jerome in Penitence
Paolo Veronese - Mystical Marriage of St. Catherine
Jacopo Zucchi – The Assembly of the Gods

Births
November 4 – Guido Reni, Italian painter (died 1642)
date unknown
Hendrick van Balen, Flemish painter from Antwerp (died 1632)
Giovanni Andrea Donducci, Italian painter of the Bolognese School (painting) (died 1655)
Marcello Provenzale, Italian painter and mosaicist (died 1639)
Tommaso Salini, Italian painter of still life (died 1625)
Abraham van Blijenberch, Flemish painter (died 1624)
probable
Jacques Bellange, French artist and printmaker from Lorraine (died 1616)
Orazio Borgianni, Italian painter and etcher of the Mannerist and early-baroque periods (died 1616)
Bartolomé de Cárdenas, Spanish painter (died 1628)
Domenico Falcini, Flemish Renaissance painter and engraver (died 1632)
Floris van Dyck, Dutch still life painter (died 1651)
(born 1575/1580) Tanzio da Varallo, Italian painter of the late-Mannerist or early Baroque period (died 1632/1633)
(born 1575/1580) Gillis d'Hondecoeter, Dutch painter who worked in a Flemish style (died 1638)
(born 1575/1580) Abraham van der Doort, Dutch-born artist and curator (died 1640)

Deaths
June 2 – Pieter Aertsen, Dutch painter (born 1508)
October 8 - Jan Matsys, Flemish painter (born c.1510)
October 20 - Cornelis Floris de Vriendt, Flemish sculptor and architect (born 1514)
November - Corneille de Lyon, Dutch painter (born 1505)
December 29 - Giovanni Battista Scultori,  Italian painter, sculptor and engraver (born 1503)
date unknown
Wen Boren, Chinese landscape painter of the Ming Dynasty (born 1502)
Federico Brandani, Italian sculptor and stuccoist who worked in an urbane Mannerist style as a court artist (born 1522/1525)
Lodovico Lombardo, Italian sculptor (born c.1507)
Giuseppe Porta, Italian painter active mainly in Venice (born 1520)

References

 
Years of the 16th century in art